Jamie Principle (born 5 July 1960) is an American house music artist and producer born in Chicago, Illinois.

Biography
Jamie Principle was a pioneer of house music when the genre began in Chicago in the early 1980s. "Jamie Principle got us all into the music," Marshall Jefferson told i-D in 1986. "He was the first one to record house and get played by Frankie Knuckles, but by the time he got a record out (over three years ago) everyone had ripped off all his ideas and were tired of his songs. People have got national recognition copying his songs note-for-note, but he hasn't got a deal, and no one has heard of him."

Principle began having entries on the Billboard Hot Dance Music/Club Play chart in the early 1990s,<ref>Jamie Principle Biography . IMO Records' Retrieved on 08 March 2011.</ref> including "Cold World", a #22 dance hit that is a collaboration with Steve "Silk" Hurley, the classic "You're All I Waited For" on the Smash Records label, or with CeCe Peniston's song "I'm Not Over You" (#2 in US Dance, #10 in US R&B) that he would co-write.

Principle's 1984 song "Your Love" is recognised as one of the first house songs. Its lyrics come from a poem that Principle wrote for his girlfriend at the time, Lisa Harris. Jamie added the music and recorded the song at home on his four-track recorder. A friend, Jose Gomez, recorded the song on tape and gave a copy to DJ Frankie Knuckles. Knuckles liked the song and played it regularly at the Chicago dance club The Power Plant. It was a sensation in the city's underground clubs for over a year before being released on Persona Records as a 12" single. Its success before an official release was entirely due to the song being played in Chicago house clubs, then copied onto tape by fans, and circulating throughout the underground scene.

Jamie's music continued to be released throughout the 1980s but often credited Knuckles as the artist. These releases included "Baby Wants to Ride", "Cold World", "Bad Boy", "Rebels", "Waiting on My Angel" and "I'm Gonna Make You Scream". In 1992, Principle released a dance album titled The Midnite Hour.

In 2004, Principle hit #1 on the US Dance Chart with "Back N Da Day", an acknowledged collaboration with the by-then house-music legend Knuckles.

Principle was featured on "Sex Murder Party" from Gorillaz' 2017 album Humanz. He also features alongside Snoop Dogg on the Gorillaz song "Hollywood" on 2018's The Now Now.

DiscographyYou’re All I’ve Waited For (1991)The Midnite Hour (1992)Waiting on My Angel (2011)Lonely2live'' (with Felix da Housecat) (2020)
Singles
"Your Love" (1984)
Waiting On My Angel (1985) US dance single sales #40
Bad Boy (1987)
I'm Gonna Make You Scream (1987)
Rebels (1988) UK #100
Baby Wants To Ride (1988) UK #84
Frankie Knuckles ft Jamie Principle Your love (1989) UK#59 (2014) UK#29
Cold World Steve "silk" Hurley ft Jamie Principle (1989) US dance club #22 US dance single sales #36
Date With The Rain (1990) US dance club #30 US dance singles sale #31
You're All I've Waited 4 (1991) US dance club #18 : The Midnite Hour
Frankie Kuckles ft Jamie Principle Back N da day (2004) US dance club #1 UK #163
Gorillaz ft Jamie Principle and Zebra Kats Sex murder party (2017) US hot rock and alternative songs #47
Gorillaz ft Jamie Principle and Snoop Dogg Hollywood (2018) US hot rock and alternative songs #26

See also
List of number-one dance hits (United States)
List of artists who reached number one on the US Dance chart
Club Zanzibar (black electronic-music venue in 1980s-era Newark, New Jersey)

References

External links
 History of House Mucis Pt4 Jamie Principle influence to house music

Living people
African-American musicians
American dance musicians
American house musicians
1960 births
Musicians from Chicago
21st-century African-American people
20th-century African-American people